Herpetopoma barbieri is a species of sea snail, a marine gastropod mollusk in the family Chilodontidae.

Description
The size of the shell varies between 7 mm and 12 mm.

Distribution
This marine species occurs off the Philippines.

References

 Poppe, Tagaro & Dekker. 2006. Visaya Supplement: Supplement 2 Pages: 3–228

External links
 

barbieri
Gastropods described in 2006